The partido of Coronel Suárez is a subdivision of the Province of Buenos Aires in Argentina.  In the south-central part of the province, it was created in 1882 by the provincial government when they divided the territory of Tres Arroyos into the partidos of Coronel Suárez, Tres Arroyos and Coronel Pringles.

Its population is mainly of Volga German descent.

Settlements
Coronel Suárez, 22,311
Huanguelén, pop.4,955,  from Suárez
Santa Trinidad, pop.1,859
San José, pop.2,127
Santa María, pop.1,770
Villa Arcadia, pop.305
Pasman, 208,  from Suárez
Curamalal, 104,  from Suárez
D'Orbigny, 49,  from Suárez
Cascada, 16,  from Suárez 
Quiñihual,  from Suárez
Bathurts,  from Suárez 
Ombú,  from Suárez
Primavera,  from Suárez
Otoño,  from Suárez
Piñeyro,  from Suárez
Zoilo,  from Suárez

Airfield
 Brig D Hector Eduardo Ruiz (SAZC)
 Elevation: 
 Coordinates: 37°26'46"S  61°53'21"W
 Runways: One paved runway,  ×

References

External links

 
 Radio Online of Coronel Suarez
 Argentina Turismo
 Diario Nuevo Día: Newspaper Coronel Suárez, Huanguelén and German Colonies
 Information on Coronel Suárez

 
1883 establishments in Argentina
Partidos of Buenos Aires Province
Volga German diaspora

pt:Partido (Buenos Aires)#Partidos da província de Buenos Aires